Kim Sanders (born October 24, 1968 in East Chicago, Indiana) is an American singer and songwriter based in Germany. Sanders began to release singles as a solo artist in 1994 and wrote songs for other musicians. In 1993 and 1994, she released three of her singles, "Show Me", "Tell Me That You Want Me" and "Ride". In 1998, Sanders became the front-woman of the German dance project Culture Beat, on the album Metamorphosis. In 2003, she released her debut album Pretty on Edge, which failed to enter the charts due to the record company placing the incorrect bar code on the album. Although this was a huge setback for Sanders' solo career, she has since collaborated with artists such as Schiller, Aural Float, Stefanie Heinzmann, Till Brönner, Nicola Conte and Wolfgang Haffner. Her solo album A Closer Look was released in 2009 with C.A.R.E. Music Group and won the Preis Der Deutschen Schallplatten Kritik (German Recording Critics Prize) in the category of Black Music, in February 2010.

In December 2011, Sanders became one of the contestants on German reality talent show The Voice of Germany. In the first season of the show, Sanders performed her cover versions of "All That She Wants", "Killing Me Softly with His Song" and "Empire State of Mind (Part II) Broken Down". She ultimately became one of the four finalists in the first season of the show but she and the other two contestants lost to Ivy Quainoo, with Sanders coming in second.

Discography

Albums

Solo singles

Featured singles

References

External links 
 

1968 births
Living people
People from East Chicago, Indiana
American women pop singers
American dance musicians
American women singer-songwriters
American expatriates in Germany
Eurodance musicians
The Voice of Germany
21st-century American women
Singer-songwriters from Indiana